Roland Boatner Howell (January 3, 1892 – March 31, 1973) was a pitcher in Major League Baseball. He played for the St. Louis Cardinals in 1912.

References

External links

1892 births
1973 deaths
Major League Baseball pitchers
St. Louis Cardinals players
Chattanooga Lookouts players
Baseball players from Louisiana
People from Napoleonville, Louisiana